2661 Bydžovský, provisional designation , is an asteroid from the outer region of the asteroid belt, approximately 30 kilometers in diameter. It was discovered on 23 March 1982, by Czech astronomer Zdeňka Vávrová at the South Bohemian Kleť Observatory in the Czech Republic. The asteroid was named after mathematician Bohumil Bydžovský.

Orbit and classification 

Bydžovský orbits the Sun in the outer main-belt at a distance of 2.7–3.3 AU once every 5 years and 3 months (1,923 days). Its orbit has an eccentricity of 0.09 and an inclination of 10° with respect to the ecliptic.

Physical characteristics 

As of 2016, Bydžovskýs size, albedo, composition and rotation period remain unknown. Based on its absolute magnitude of 11.4, its diameter is estimated to measure between 13 and 32 kilometers, assuming an albedo in the range of 0.05 to 0.25. Since most asteroids in the outer main-belt are of a carbonaceous rather than of a silicaceous composition, with low albedos, typically closer to 0.05 than to 0.25, the asteroid's diameter might be on the upper end of NASA's published conversion table, as the lower the reflectivity (albedo), the larger the body's diameter for a given absolute magnitude.

Naming 

This minor planet was named in honour of mathematician Bohumil Bydžovský (1880–1969), chancellor of the Charles University in Prague. He was born in southern Bohemia and became the most eminent citizen of the Czech town Veselí on the Lužnice river, after which the minor planets 2321 Lužnice and 2599 Veselí were named, respectively. The official naming citation was published by the Minor Planet Center on 6 February 1993.

References

External links 
 Asteroid Lightcurve Database (LCDB), query form (info )
 Dictionary of Minor Planet Names, Google books
 Asteroids and comets rotation curves, CdR – Observatoire de Genève, Raoul Behrend
 Discovery Circumstances: Numbered Minor Planets (1)-(5000)  – Minor Planet Center
 
 

002661
Discoveries by Zdeňka Vávrová
Named minor planets
19820323